The Archdiocesan Shrine of Saint Catherine of Alexandria, also known as St. Catherine's Church or the Carcar Church, is a Roman Catholic church in Carcar, Cebu, Philippines.

History
The settlement of Carcar in Cebu has been covered by a parish since 1599 which was run by the Augustinians. The current Carcar Church was built in sometime in the 19th century. This is around the time when Cebu experienced an economic boom and became a major producer of agricultural goods. The church was named after Carcar's patron saint, Catherine of Alexandria.

Architecture and design

The Carcar Church exhibits the form of a basilica. Its complex also host a separate building which is intended and used as a convent. It is built using coral stones with part of its structure, specifically its upper stories and ceiling made using hardwood. The structure is of mixed architecture style. Parts of the structure exhibit examples of Neo-Mudéjar, Revival Baroque, and Austrian Baroque architecture. Its wooden choir loft is of Gothic Revival character. The church building is also described as having Greco-Roman and Muslim influence. The convent building also has characteristics of the indigenous bahay na bato. 

The church's ceiling is decorated by Cebuano artist Canuto Avila which was commissioned by Fr. Anastasio Nuñez del Corro. The ceiling mural was executed from 1910s to the 1920s. The artwork is an example of trompe-l'œil with rosettes as motif rather than featuring a theological subject.

Notes

References

Buildings and structures in Cebu
Roman Catholic churches in Cebu
19th-century churches in the Philippines
Churches in the Roman Catholic Archdiocese of Cebu